Baneswar Sarathibala Mahavidyalaya, established in 2009, is and Honours and General degree college in Baneswar. It is in the Cooch Behar district. It offers undergraduate courses in arts. It is affiliated with  Cooch Behar Panchanan Barma University.

History
Baneswar Sarathhibala Mahavidyalaya derived its name from the holy temple of Lord Shivasituated at Baneswar and bears the name of Sarathibala Devi, the mother of the Donar. The college began at Baneswar Khabsa High School in the year 2009. The members of the first organizing committee were Sri. Tarini Ray (Honorable MP), Dr. Malay Ranjan Sarkar (Principal of Cooch BT and Evening College), Sri. Ananta Roy (MIC in Forest Department, WB), Sri. Dwijendralal Bhowmik (HM-Baneswar Khabsa High School), Sri. Jibendra Debsingha (Assistant Secretary), and Smt. Pratima Sarkar (Treasurer). In the following year the college moved to Hatiduba on 9 March 2013, on land donated by Sri Anil Karjee, a native of the area. The first Governing Body of the College formed on 10 August 2015 with members from various fields of academia and non-teaching background, such as Sri. Rabindranath Ghosh (President, Honourable MIC of NBDD), Dr. Narendra Nath Ray (Secretary, Teacher-in-Charge), Prof. Sablu Barman (Government nominee), Dr. Mridul Ghosh (University Nominee), Prof. Dwijendranath Singha (University Nominee), Prof. Supam Biswas (TS Nominee), Smt. Suvashree Roy Chowdhury (TS Nominee), Prof. Hasanur Mondol (TS Nominee), Prof. Asit Kanti Sarkar (TS Nominee), Sri. AlokAich (NTS Nominee), Sri. Debadrata Karjee (NTS Nominee), Sri. Anil Karjee (Land Donor),Sri. Uttam Ghosh(GS). The college was temporarily affiliated with the University of North Bengal and later got its first permanent affiliation under the Coochbehar Panchanan Barma University on 20 September 2017.

Courses Offered
1. BA(Honours)
2. BA(Programme)

Departments

Honours
1. Bengali
2. English
3. History
4. Education

Programme
1. Bengali
2. English
3. History
4. Education
5. Philosophy
6. Geography
7. Physical Education

See also

References

External links 
 

Universities and colleges in Cooch Behar district
Colleges affiliated to Cooch Behar Panchanan Barma University
Academic institutions formerly affiliated with the University of North Bengal
Educational institutions established in 2009
2009 establishments in West Bengal